The National Championship was the next stage from the regional stage of 2020–21 Thai League 3. The winners and runners-ups of each region would qualified to this round to finding three clubs promoting to the 2021–22 Thai League 2.

Teams

Note:

Qualifying play-offs

Play-off round

|-
!colspan=3|Northern region

|-
!colspan=3|Bangkok metropolitan region

|}

Northern region

Bangkok metropolitan region

Group stage

Upper region

Lower region

Knockout stage
Winners, runners-up, and third place of 2020–21 Thai League 3 would be promoted to the 2021–22 Thai League 2.

Third place play-off

Summary

|}

Matches

Rajpracha won 2–1 on aggregate.

Final

Summary

|}

Matches

Lamphun Warriors won 3–2 on aggregate.

Teams promoted to 2021–22 Thai League 2
 Lamphun Warriors (champions)
 Muangkan United (runners-up)
 Rajpracha (Third-placed)

References

Thai League 3
3